Nebria dahlii is a species of ground beetle in the Nebriinae subfamily that can be found in Austria, all states of former Yugoslavia (except for North Macedonia), and Italy.

Subspecies
Nebria dahilii dahilii Duftschmid, 1812 Austria, Bosnia and Herzegovina, Croatia, Italy, Slovenia
Nebria dahilii littoralis Dejean, 1826 Croatia
Nebria dahilii montenegrina Apfelbeck, 1904 Bosnia and Herzegovina
Nebria dahilii velebitica Heyden, 1884 Croatia

References

dahilii
Beetles described in 1812
Beetles of Europe